Ewage, also known as Notu, is a Papuan language spoken in the "tail" of Papua New Guinea. Preference for the name depends on the region. Its two dialects are Sose/Sohe (Western Plains Orokaiva) and Ifane/Ihane (Eastern Plains Orokaiva) (Smallhorn 2011:47).

References

Smallhorn, Jacinta Mary. 2011. The Binanderean languages of Papua New Guinea: reconstruction and subgrouping. Canberra: Pacific Linguistics.

Languages of Oro Province
Greater Binanderean languages